Effective gross income is the relationship or ratio between the sale price of the value of a property and its effective gross rental income.

The anticipated income from all operations of the real property after an allowance is made for a vacancy and collection losses. Effective gross income includes items constituting other income: income generated from the operation of the real property that is not derived from space rental (such as parking rental or income from vending machines).

For example, if two properties have a potential income of $15,000 if they are all filled to maximum occupancy, and the average vacancy rate of the properties in cash is $1,250 (the sum of the rent that is not coming in by the vacancy in the properties). The average vacancy rate is then subtracted from the potential income from renting the properties so the total is $13,750, which becomes the effective gross income.

See also
 Earnings before interest and taxes

Real estate terminology
Financial ratios